Brenda Msangi is a Tanzanian health executive, chief executive officer of Comprehensive Community Based Rehabilitation Tanzania (CCBRT) in Dar es Salaam.

Msangi has over thirteen years experience as a healthcare professional. She was appointed CEO of CCBRT in December 2018. She has raised awareness of the slow processing of health insurance claims in Tanzania, and of the disproportionate impact of fistula on under-educated women. In August 2019 she spoke on obstetric fistula at TEDxOysterbay. She has also launched initiatives to help disabled Tanzanians get jobs.

References

External links
 Breaking the Silence on Obstetric Fistula at TEDxOysterbay

Year of birth missing (living people)
Living people
Chief executives in the healthcare industry
Tanzanian chief executives
Women chief executives